Jack Archer is a British–Irish actor. He is best known for portraying Jamie Marshbrook in The Bay (TV series) as well as Michael Leeks in Call The Midwife. He will also star in the Canal+ & BBC drama series Marie Antoinette created by Deborah Davis of The Favourite.

Education 
Jack Archer attended the Royal Welsh College of Music and Drama where he trained as an actor.

Career 

Archer made his debut in the stage production Nivelli's War at the Lyric Theatre, Belfast which transferred to the New Victory Theater in New York. He received a 'Best Actor' nomination from The Stage Debut Awards for his performance as the lead role Ernst. Archer then played Hamilton in The Finborough Theatre's revival of Quaint Honour, staged once before in 1958, where he also received a nomination from The Off West End Theatre Awards for 'Best Male Performance in a Play'.  In 2019 he joined the lead cast of Torben Betts' Monogamy which toured the UK and went on to run at The Park Theatre in London.  Archer has also starred in various other productions in London including Confessional at the Southwark Playhouse, Blue at the Gate Theatre and When The Sea Swallows Us Whole at The Vault Festival.

Archer made his screen debut playing Jamie Marshbrook in the second series of The Bay on ITV. He then starred as Joseph in the 2021 film The Haunting of Alice Bowles written and directed by Philip Franks. He next appeared as Michael Leeks in the tenth series of Call The Midwife in a story following conversion therapy in Britain during the 1960s. Archer has recently filmed a television adaptation of Marie Antoinette's life written by Deborah Davis. The 8-part series was part shot in Versailles and is being produced by Canal+ and Banijay. It is now airing on the BBC.

References

External links 

Jack Archer at Waring McKenna

Living people
21st-century British actors
Alumni of the Royal Welsh College of Music & Drama
Alumni of the University of Birmingham
Year of birth missing (living people)